Hrastje is a village on the left bank of the Sava River just south of Kranj in the Upper Carniola region of Slovenia. Until June 2002, the settlement was part of the City Municipality of Kranj.

Name
The name Hrastje is derived from the Slovene common noun hrast 'oak', referring to the local vegetation. The settlement was known as Hrastie in German in the past.

Church

The local church is dedicated to Saint Matthew. It was built in 1508 in a Gothic style and altered in the 17th century. Its greatest treasure is a 17th-century gilded wooden altar. The belfry was built in 1723.

References

External links

Hrastje on Geopedia

Populated places in the City Municipality of Kranj